Associazione Calcio Fiorentina returned to Serie A, following the 1993 relegation, and immediately established itself as a mid-table side once again. Portuguese playmaker Rui Costa and Brazilian World Champion defender Márcio Santos were the two main signings in the summer, and both of them were key players for the team. Rui Costa also established the special partnership with star striker Gabriel Batistuta that was going to be the key ingredient for the coming five years in Fiorentina's ascent towards the top of Italian football. Batistuta became league topscorer with 26 goals, many of them provided by Rui Costa's passes.

Players

Transfers

Winter

Competitions

Serie A

League table

Results summary

Results by round

Matches

Coppa Italia

Statistics

Players statistics

Goalscorers
  Gabriel Batistuta 26 (8)
  Rui Costa 9
  Angelo Carbone 4
  Sandro Cois 3
  Fabrizio Di Mauro 3

References

ACF Fiorentina seasons
Fiorentina